Fadi Ziadeh is a Lebanese diplomat currently serving as Lebanon ambassador to Canada.

Education 
Ziadeh was educated at Notre-Dame University where he Graduated in Management and Economics and holds an MBA from McGill University.

Career 
He began his diplomatic career in 1999 as an Attaché at the Ministry of Foreign Affairs before being deployed on foreign mission to Lebanese Embassy in Abu Dhabi serving as Consul and Deputy Head of Mission. He was transferred to Lebanese Embassy in United Arab Emirates and served as First Secretary/Political Advisor and later moved to Russia as Chargé d’Affaires. 

From 2011 to 2012, he served as Counsellor of the Lebanese Mission to the United Nations in New York. He became Consul General on 1 July 2012 and served in this capacity until July 2017 when he was appointed Ambassador Plenipotentiary and Extraordinary of Lebanon to Canada. She presented her letter of credence to Governor General of Canada on 29 January 2018.

References 

Lebanese diplomats
University of Notre Dame alumni
Year of birth missing (living people)
Living people
Ambassadors of Lebanon to Canada